The 2004 Irish Greyhound Derby took place during August and September with the final being held at Shelbourne Park in Dublin on 18 September 2004. 

The winner Like A Shot won €150,000 and was trained by Owen McKenna, owned by Michael Kelly and bred by Patrick 'Paddy' Sinnott. The race was sponsored by the Paddy Power.

Final result 
At Shelbourne, 18 September (over 550 yards):

Distances 
¾, ½, ¾, 2¼, head (lengths)

Competition Report
162 greyhounds lined up for the 2004 Paddy Power Irish Derby including the 2004 English Greyhound Derby champion Droopys Scholes. The increase in entries resulted in the first round being spread over three nights. 

Droopys Shearer provided the best time in the opening round, the Ted Soppitt Select Stakes winner recorded 29.54. Persian Ruler won in 29.74 and Droopys Scholes in 29.75. In the second round Persian Ruler won again in 29.55 as did Droopys Shearer in 29.64 but there was a major shock with the elimination of Droopys Scholes, he found trouble and could not recover to qualify for the next round. World Class also returned to form with a 29.82 victory.

In the third round Deerfield Site went fastest in 29.63 and Droopys Maldini crossed the line in 29.74. Droopys Maldini then won again in the quarter finals going even better in a fast 29.52. Deerfield Site won well again as did Mineola Farloe with the remaining heat being won by Disguised. Like A Shot and World Class also qualified for the semi-finals.

Geldrops Touch won the first semi-final from Droopys Marco with World Class making the final holding off Deerfield Site. The second semi-final was a troubled heat that led to the unbeaten Disguised winning it from Like A Shot and Droopys Maldini.

Droopys Marco trapped well in the final to take an early lead from the fast starting Disguised, Marcos litter brother Droopys Maldini became the new leader by halfway, pursued by outsider Like A Shot despite the latter having to check behind Disguised. Like A Shot finished strongly to negotiate a path passed Droopys Maldini and Disguised to claim the title. The McKenna family continued their association with the Irish Derby history, the winning trainer was Owen McKenna son of Ger McKenna.

Quarter finals

Semi finals

See also
2004 UK & Ireland Greyhound Racing Year

References

Greyhound Derby
Irish Greyhound Derby
Irish Greyhound Derby